Allí abajo (English: Down there) is a Spanish television comedy series produced by Plano a Plano for Antena 3. Although it is compared to successful film Ocho apellidos vascos, creators César Benítez and Aitor Gabilondo claim they had on their minds the concept of the show long before the movie, and that it has more in common with French film Bienvenue chez les Ch'tis. It premiered to more than 6 million viewers on a simulcast airing on Antena 3, Neox and Nova, becoming the most-watched series premiere of a Spanish television show since Aída in 2005 and the best series premiere for an Antena 3 show since Compuesta y sin novio in 1994.

Plot
The series revolves around Iñaki (Jon Plazaola), a 30-year-old Basque man who has never left Euskadi. He lives in San Sebastián with his mother Maritxu (Ane Gabarain), the classic absorbent, dominant Basque matriarch who sees Iñaki as a perennial child unable to move forward in life on his own. Iñaki runs a bar he inherited from his father, where his only affective exchange is the weekly game of mus with his longtime friends, although Nekane (Alazne Etxebarria), the waitress, is madly in love with him but fails to tell him time and time again.

One day, Iñaki is forced to join his mother in a trip to Seville, a trip he definitely isn't ready for. Nothing will ever be the same for him once he finds himself stuck "down there".

Cast

Main 
 Jon Plazaola as Iñaki Irazabalbeitia
 María León as Carmen Almonte
 Salva Reina as José Narváez
 Mariano Peña as Benito Benjumea (main, seasons 1–3, 5; recurring, season 4)
 Ane Gabarain as Maritxu Galarza
 Mari Paz Sayago as Dolores Ocaña
 Óscar Terol as Antxón Oleaga
 Gorka Aguinagalde as Koldo Intxaustegui
 Iker Galartza as Peio
 Alfonso Sánchez as Rober Almenar (main, seasons 1–2)
 Noemí Ruiz as Trini Lozano (main, seasons 1–3; recurring, season 4)
 Alazne Etxebarria as Nekane (main, seasons 1; recurring, season 2)
 David Arnaiz as Cristóbal Benjumea (recurring, seasons 1–2; main, seasons 3–5)
 Nerea Garmendia as Gotzone Abaroa (main, seasons 3–4; guest, season 5)

Recurring 
 Maribel Salas as Bego Galarza
 Santi Ugalde as Sabino Goikolea
 Rocío García Molina as Irene Escobar
 Carmina Barrios as Luci
 Carmen Frigolet as Merche
 Antonia Gómez as Piedad
 Teresa Quintero as Ángela Parrón
 Alberto López as Rafi Almonte
 Beatriz Cotobal as Isabel

Soundtrack
The original music score is composed and produced by Cesar Benito

Episodes

Series overview

Season 1 (2015)

Season 2 (2016)

Season 3 (2017)

Season 4 (2018)

Season 5 (2019)

References

External links
 

2015 Spanish television series debuts
2019 Spanish television series endings
Antena 3 (Spanish TV channel) network series
Television shows set in the Basque Country (autonomous community)
Television shows set in Seville
2010s Spanish comedy television series
Television series by Plano a Plano